The Santa Susana Tunnel is a railroad tunnel that connects the Simi and San Fernando valleys in Southern California. The tunnel is credited with saving considerable time and distance between San Francisco and Los Angeles. The tunnel is located beneath the Santa Susana Pass.

History

Construction of the tunnel began in 1900 by the Southern Pacific Transportation Company and was completed in 1904. The first train to use the tunnel was on March 20, 1904.

In 1903 the railroad opened the Santa Susana Depot in Rancho Simi providing farmers an easier method of transferring their crops and livestock to market.

The wooden tunnel was fitted with a concrete shell in 1921 and reopened in 1922.

In 1972, the tunnel underwent minor renovations.

In 1997, officials began seeking options to restore the tunnel due to its deterioration over time. Due to the separation of rock from the tunnel's concrete shell over time, the tunnel was considered vulnerable in the event of a serious earthquake. Local officials attempted to secure  in federal funds to fix the tunnel but ultimately failed. In 1998, an initial  was invested into the tunnel's restoration. Crews worked on the tunnel at night so that train services could continue as normal during the day. Crews completed maintenance on the tunnel in October 2000.

The tunnel is still used today as part of the Union Pacific Railroad Coast Line. Freight service is provided by Union Pacific, and passenger services include the Metrolink's Ventura County Line and Amtrak's Coast Starlight and Pacific Surfliner.

References

Railroad tunnels in California
Simi Hills
Tunnels in Los Angeles County, California
Transportation buildings and structures in Ventura County, California
Chatsworth, Los Angeles
Santa Susana Mountains
Tunnels completed in 1904
1904 in California
Underground commuter rail
Southern Pacific Railroad
Union Pacific Railroad tunnels